Aidan Kearney (born 24 May 1979) is a retired Irish rugby union player. He played as a second row and occasionally in the back row representing Leinster and Ulster professionally between 2000 and 2004. Notable for his athleticism, Kearney also played for the Ireland sevens side at the 2001 Rugby World Cup Sevens and was a member of the Ireland side which won the FIRA U19 World Championships in France in 1998 alongside Brian O'Driscoll.

After retirement Kearney took up coaching and has had roles with Suttonians RFC, Dublin City University, Trinity College, Dublin and CYM RFC as well as working as a rugby operations officer with the IRFU.

References

Leinster Rugby players
Irish rugby union players
Ulster Rugby players
People educated at St Paul's College, Raheny
People educated at St Michael's College, Dublin
University College Dublin R.F.C. players
1979 births
Living people
Rugby union players from Dublin (city)